Salitre is a municipality of the Northeastern state of Ceará in Brazil. It is located in the southwest corner of the state, being the only municipality to have boundaries with both Piauí and Bahia states.

References 

Municipalities in Ceará